The Rookies is an American police procedural series that aired on ABC from 1972 until 1976. It follows the exploits of three rookie police officers working in an unidentified city for the fictitious Southern California Police Department (SCPD).

History
The success of Joseph Wambaugh's book, The New Centurions, as well as NBC's ratings success with Adam-12, had sparked interest at the time in a more realistic depiction and storytelling of the typical uniformed police officer.  Although various incidents during the late 1960s and early 1970s, particularly in California, had sparked controversy and negative feelings toward police officers in general, The Rookies tried to better humanize the character of a police officer and show the struggles that new, younger men and women (who were often Vietnam-era military veterans and/or college graduates) faced in their lives as law enforcement persons sworn to serve and protect the public.

The pilot for the series began as an ABC Movie of the Week airing on March 7, 1972. The TV movie features five rookies newly arrived at a police academy in southern California: cadets Jared Whitman (Robert F. Lyons), Kevin Lassiter (Jeff Pomerantz), Mike Danko (Sam Melville), William "Willie" Gillis (Michael Ontkean), and Terry Webster (Georg Stanford Brown), all coming from different backgrounds including the military, college and social work. The cadets' training sergeant was Eddie Ryker, played by Darren McGavin. In the later series, Sgt. Ryker was promoted to lieutenant and was played by Gerald S. O'Loughlin. The character of Jill Danko in the movie pilot was played by Jennifer Billingsley, but was recast for the series with Kate Jackson appearing as a registered nurse.

Episodes

The Rookies centers around three rookie officers: Danko, Webster and Gillis, and their superior officer/mentor Lieutenant Ryker. The show was produced by Aaron Spelling and Leonard Goldberg. Each episode showcased highly dramatized versions of police cases and activities, often intertwined with the off-duty lives of the officers and their wives. Danko was the only officer in the series who was married. Although filmed in and around Los Angeles, the "SCPD" badge the officers wore was said to stand for "Southern California Police Department."

After the second season, Gillis was replaced (Ontkean left the show over complaints in the story writing) with the character Chris Owens, played by Bruce Fairbairn.

During the series' third season, a two-part episode (titled "S.W.A.T.") aired on February 17, 1975 and served as the pilot for the spin-off series S.W.A.T. The SWAT two-part episode only aired on ABC in 1975 and was subsequently never part of the syndicated TV rerun package as Spelling-Goldberg decided it might confuse viewers as to which TV show it belonged. Both parts of the S.W.A.T. pilot are now considered "lost".

Cast

Notable guest stars

 Claude Akins
 Herbert Anderson
 Tom Atkins
 Malcolm Atterbury
 René Auberjonois
 Ned Beatty
 Eric Braeden
 Brooke Bundy
 Wendell Burton
 Joseph Campanella
 John Carradine (voice only)
 Jack Colvin
 Didi Conn
 Tyne Daly (who was married to Georg Stanford Brown at the time)
 Susan Dey
 Elinor Donahue
 Jerry Douglas
 Leif Erickson
 Bill Erwin
 Shelley Fabares
 Mike Farrell
 Arthur Franz
 Victor French
 Beverly Garland
 Lorraine Gary
 Don Gordon
 Louis Gossett Jr.
 Harold Gould
 Teresa Graves
 Robert Harland
 Christina Hart
 Richard Hatch
 Katherine Helmond
 Robyn Hilton
 Pat Hingle
 Earl Holliman
 Bo Hopkins
 Clint Howard
 Rance Howard
 Season Hubley
 David Huddleston
 Amy Irving
 Herbert Jefferson Jr.
 Don Johnson
 William Katt
 Sally Kirkland
 Martin Kove
 Matthew Labyorteaux
 Cheryl Ladd
 Geoffrey Lewis
 Cleavon Little
 Laurence Luckinbill, as "Larry Luckinbill"
 Arlene Martel
 Jared Martin
 Strother Martin
 Roddy McDowall
 Cameron Mitchell
 Belinda Montgomery
 Roger E. Mosley
 Jim Nabors
 Charles Napier
 Nick Nolte
 Michael Parks
 Larry Pennell
 Albert Popwell
 Don Porter
 Stefanie Powers (billed as Stephanie Powers)
 Dack Rambo
 Della Reese
 John Ritter
 Andrew Robinson
 Alex Rocco
 John Saxon
 Jerry Schilling
 William Shatner
 Marc Singer
 Martin Sheen
 Mark Slade
 Jeremy Slate
 Charles Martin Smith
 Jaclyn Smith
 David Soul
 Sissy Spacek
 Craig Stevens
 Robin Strasser
 Austin Stoker
 Don Stroud
 Olive Sturgess
 Kristoffer Tabori
 Vic Tayback
 Linda Thompson
 John Travolta
 Lurene Tuttle
 Dick Van Patten
 Abe Vigoda
 Robert Walden
 Ray Walston
 Red West
 David White
 Fred Williamson
 William Windom
 James Woods
 Keenan Wynn
 Tony Young

Syndication
In September 1974, Spelling-Goldberg Productions and Worldvision Enterprises (who previously distributed programming produced by Spelling and ABC in the syndication market) signed a contract giving Worldvision exclusive distribution rights to the series for 25 years. However, Worldvision backed out of the contract in May 1975, and in 1976, Spelling-Goldberg sued Worldvision for more than $5.6 million in damages, plus "general damages for fraud to be ascertained". Viacom Enterprises would then acquire distribution rights to The Rookies in the place of Worldvision, for broadcast beginning in 1977; as Viacom intended to sell the program for broadcast during Family Viewing Hour, they elected to edit out portions that they deemed too violent for family viewing. In addition, five episodes were excluded from the original syndicated run, due to their overt violent content. Viacom also offered local stations the option to air either the condensed 30-minute episodes or the regular, full length 60-minute episodes.

The same year Viacom assumed distribution of The Rookies in 1977, Spelling-Goldberg sold their production company to Columbia Pictures Television, which would take over syndication of The Rookies following the expiration of Viacom's contract. Sony Pictures Television, who owns most of Spelling-Goldberg's output, is the current distributor.

The series was seen in reruns on TV Land in 2003. In 2014, the show aired on Grit weekday mornings (though sometimes preempted by movies). In 2016, the show aired on FamilyNet six days a week.

The series began on Heroes & Icons network in March 2021, airing overnights on Saturdays.

The Rookies is being aired on May 29 and 30, 2021 on Decades TV Network as part of "The Decades Binge".

Home media
On July 17, 2007, Sony Pictures Home Entertainment released the complete first season on DVD in Region 1 for the very first time.  The original pilot film was not included as part of this release.

On August 7, 2012 Shout Factory released the complete second season on DVD in Region 1.

References

External links

 
 

1972 television films
1972 films
ABC Movie of the Week
1972 American television series debuts
1976 American television series endings
1970s American crime drama television series
1970s American police procedural television series
American Broadcasting Company original programming
English-language television shows
Television series by Sony Pictures Television
Television series by Spelling Television
Television shows set in California
Films scored by Laurence Rosenthal